Ferdinand II (10 March 1452 – 23 January 1516) was King of Aragon from 1479 until his death in 1516. As the husband of Queen Isabella I of Castile, he was also King of Castile from 1475 to 1504 (as Ferdinand V). He reigned jointly with Isabella over a dynastically unified Spain; together they are known as the Catholic Monarchs. Ferdinand is considered the de facto first king of Spain, and was described as such during his reign, even though, legally, Castile and Aragon remained two separate kingdoms until they were formally united by the Nueva Planta decrees issued between 1707 and 1716.

The Crown of Aragon that Ferdinand inherited in 1479 included the kingdoms of Aragon, Valencia, Majorca, Sardinia, and Sicily, as well as the Principality of Catalonia. His marriage to Isabella is regarded as the "cornerstone in the foundation of the Spanish monarchy". They played a major role in the European colonization of the Americas, sponsoring the first voyage of Christopher Columbus in 1492. That year the couple defeated Granada, the last Muslim state in Western Europe, thus completing the centuries-long Reconquista.

Following Isabella's death in 1504, the couple's daughter Joanna became queen of the Crown of Castile. That year, after a war with France, Ferdinand conquered the Kingdom of Naples. In 1507 he became regent of Castile on behalf of Joanna, who was alleged to be mentally unstable. In 1506, as part of a treaty with France, Ferdinand married Germaine of Foix, with whom he had no surviving children. In 1512 he conquered the Kingdom of Navarre, ruling all the territories comprising modern-day Spain until his death in 1516. He was nominally succeeded by his daughter Joanna, but power was soon assumed by her son Charles I (later Holy Roman Emperor Charles V).

Early life
Ferdinand was born on 10 March 1452, in the town of Sos del Rey Católico, Kingdom of Aragon, as the son of John II of Aragon (whose family was a cadet branch of the House of Trastámara) by his second wife, Juana Enríquez.

Marriage and accession
Ferdinand married Isabella, the half-sister and heir presumptive of Henry IV of Castile, on 19 October 1469 in Valladolid, Kingdom of Castile and Leon. Isabella also belonged to the royal House of Trastámara, and the two were second cousins by descent from John I of Castile. They were married with a clear prenuptial agreement on sharing power, and under the joint motto "tanto monta, monta tanto". He became jure uxoris King of Castile when Isabella succeeded her deceased brother in 1474. The two young monarchs were initially obliged to fight a civil war against Joanna, the purported daughter of Henry IV, and were swiftly successful. When Ferdinand succeeded his father as King of Aragon in 1479, the Crown of Castile and the various territories of the Crown of Aragon were united in a personal union. The various states were not formally administered as a single unit, but as separate political units under the same Crown. (The legal merging of Aragon and Castile into a single Spain occurred under Philip V in 1707–1715.)

The first years of Ferdinand and Isabella's joint rule saw the Spanish conquest of the Emirate of Granada, the last Islamic al-Andalus entity on the Iberian peninsula, completed in 1492.

The completion of the Reconquista was not the only significant act performed by Ferdinand and Isabella in that year. In March 1492, the monarchs issued the Edict of Expulsion of the Jews, also called the Alhambra Decree, a document which ordered all Jews either to be baptised and convert to Christianity or to leave the country. It allowed Mudéjar Moors (Islamic) and converso Marrano Jews to stay, while expelling all unconverted Jews from Castile and Aragon (most Jews either converted or moved to the Ottoman Empire). 1492 was also the year in which the monarchs commissioned Christopher Columbus to find a westward maritime route for access to Asia, which resulted in the Spanish arrival in the Americas.

In 1494 the Treaty of Tordesillas divided the entire world beyond Europe between Portugal and Castile (Spain) for conquest and dominion purposes – by a north–south line drawn down the Atlantic Ocean.

Forced conversions
Ferdinand abrogated a section of the 1491 Treaty of Granada peace treaty in 1502 by dismissing the clearly guaranteed religious freedom for Mudéjar Muslims. Ferdinand forced all Muslims in Castile and Aragon to convert, converso Moriscos, to Catholicism, or else be expelled. Some of the Muslims who remained were mudéjar artisans, who could design and build in the Moorish style. This was also practised by the Spanish inquisitors on the converso Marrano Jewish population of Spain.

The latter part of Ferdinand's life was largely taken up with disputes with successive kings of France over control of Italy, the Italian Wars. In 1494, Charles VIII of France invaded Italy and expelled Alfonso II, who was Ferdinand's first cousin once removed and step nephew, from the throne of Naples. Ferdinand allied with various Italian princes and with Emperor Maximilian I to expel the French by 1496 and install Alfonso's son, Ferdinand II, on the Neapolitan throne. In 1501, following Ferdinand II's death and accession of his uncle Frederick, Ferdinand signed an agreement with Charles VIII's successor, Louis XII, who had just successfully asserted his claims to the Duchy of Milan, to partition Naples between them, with Campania and the Abruzzi, including Naples itself, going to the French and Ferdinand taking Apulia and Calabria. The agreement soon fell apart and, over the next several years, Ferdinand's great general Gonzalo Fernández de Córdoba fought to take Naples from the French, finally succeeding by 1504.

Some time before 1502 Andreas Palaiologos, the last exiled claimant to the Byzantine throne of his house, sold his titles and royal and imperial rights to Ferdinand. Those, however, had never been made use of, due to the doubtful nature of the deal.

After Isabella

Isabella made her will on 12 October 1504, in advance of her 26 November 1504 death. In it she spelled out the succession to the crown of Castile, leaving it to Joanna and then to Joanna's son Charles. Isabella was dubious of Joanna's ability to rule and was not confident of Joanna's husband Archduke Philip. Ferdinand moved quickly after his wife's death to continue his role in Castile. On the day of his wife's death, he formally renounced his title as king of Castile and instead became governor (gobernador) of the kingdom, as a way to become regent. Philip deemed his wife sane and fit to rule. A compromise was forged between Philip and Ferdinand, which gave Ferdinand a continued role in Castile. Ferdinand had served as Joanna's regent during her absence in the Netherlands, ruled by her husband Archduke Philip. Ferdinand attempted to retain the regency permanently, but was rebuffed by the Castilian nobility and replaced with Joanna's husband.

In the Treaty of Villafáfila of 1506, Ferdinand renounced not only the government of Castile in favor of Philip but also the lordship of the Indies, withholding half of the income of the "kingdoms of the Indies". Joanna and Philip immediately added to their titles the kingdoms of Indies, Islands and Mainland of the Ocean Sea. But the Treaty of Villafáfila did not hold for long because of the death of Philip; Ferdinand returned as regent of Castile and as "lord of the Indies".

The widowed Ferdinand made an alliance with France in July 1505 and married Germaine of Foix, cementing the alliance with France. She was the granddaughter of his half-sister Queen Eleanor of Navarre and niece of Louis XII of France. Had Ferdinand's son with Germaine, John, Prince of Girona, born on 3 May 1509, survived, "the crown of Aragon would inevitably been separated from Castile" and denied his grandson Charles the crown of Aragon. But the infant Prince John died within hours and was buried in the convent of Saint Paul in Valladolid, Kingdom of Castile and Leon, and later transferred to Poblet Monastery, Vimbodí i Poblet, Catalonia, Kingdom of Aragon, traditional burial site of the kings of Aragon.

Ferdinand had no legal position in Castile, with the cortes of Toro recognizing Joanna and her children as heirs and Ferdinand left Castile in July 1506. After his son-in-law Philip's untimely death in September 1506, Castile was in crisis. Joanna was allegedly mentally unstable, and Joanna's and Philip's son, Charles, the future Emperor Charles V, was only six years old. Cardinal Francisco Jiménez de Cisneros, the Chancellor of the Kingdom, was made regent, but the upper nobility reasserted itself. Ferdinand led an army against Pedro Fernández de Córdoba y Pacheco, the marquis of Priego of Córdoba, who had seized control there by force.

In 1508 war resumed in Italy, this time against the Republic of Venice, in which all the other powers with interests on the Italian peninsula, including Louis XII, Ferdinand II, Maximilian, and Pope Julius II joined together against as the League of Cambrai. Although the French were victorious against Venice at the Battle of Agnadello, the League of Cambrai soon fell apart, as both the Pope and Ferdinand II became suspicious of French intentions. Instead, the 'Holy League' was formed, in which now all the powers joined together against Louis XII and France.

In November 1511 Ferdinand and his son-in-law King Henry VIII of England signed the Treaty of Westminster, pledging mutual aid between the two against Navarre and France ahead of the Spanish invasion of Navarre as of July 1512. After the fall of Granada in 1492, he had manoeuvred for years to take over the throne of the Basque kingdom, ruled by Queen Catherine of Navarre and King John III of Navarre, also lords of Béarn and other sizeable territories north of the Pyrenees and in Gascony. Ferdinand annexed Navarre first to the Crown of Aragon, but later, under the pressure of Castilian noblemen, to the Crown of Castile. The Holy League was generally successful in Italy, as well, driving the French from Milan, which was restored to its Sforza dukes by the peace treaty in 1513. The French were successful in reconquering Milan two years later, however.

Ferdinand II died on 23 January 1516 in Madrigalejo, Extremadura, Kingdom of Castile and Leon. He is entombed at Capilla Real, Granada. His wife Isabella, daughter Joanna, and son-in-law Philip rest beside him there.

Legacy and succession

Ferdinand and Isabella established a highly effective sovereignty under equal terms. They utilised a prenuptial agreement to lay down their terms. During their reign they supported each other effectively in accordance to his joint motto of equality: "Tanto monta [or monta tanto], Isabel como Fernando" ("They amount to the same, Isabel and Ferdinand"). Isabella and Ferdinand's achievements were remarkable: Spain was united, or at least more united than it ever had been; the crown power was centralised, at least in name; the reconquista was successfully concluded; the groundwork for the most dominant military machine of the next century and a half was laid; a legal framework was created; the church was reformed. Even without the benefit of the American expansion, Spain would have been a major European power. Columbus' discovery set the country on the course for the first modern world power.

During the reign of Ferdinand and Isabella, Spain pursued alliances through marriage with Portugal, Habsburg Austria, and Burgundy. Their first-born daughter Isabella was married to Alfonso of Portugal, and their first-born son John was married to Margaret of Austria. However, the deaths of these children, and the death of Isabella, altered the succession plan forcing Ferdinand to yield the government of Castile to Philip of Habsburg the husband of his second daughter Joanna.

In 1502, the members of the Aragonese Cortes gathered in Zaragoza, and Parliaments of the Kingdom of Valencia and the Principality of Catalonia in Barcelona, as members of the Crown of Aragon, swore an oath of loyalty to their daughter Joanna as heiress, but Alonso de Aragón, Archbishop of Saragossa, stated firmly that this oath was invalid and did not change the law of succession which could only be done by formal legislation by the Cortes with the King. So, when King Ferdinand died on 23 January 1516, his daughter Joanna inherited the Crown of Aragon, and his grandson Charles became Governor General (regent). Nevertheless, the Flemish wished that Charles assume the royal title, and this was supported by his paternal grandfather the Holy Roman Emperor Maximilian I and by Pope Leo X. Consequently, after Ferdinand II's funeral on 14 March 1516, Charles I was proclaimed King of Castile and of Aragon jointly with his mother. Finally, the Castilian Regent, Cardinal Jiménez de Cisneros accepted the fait accompli, and the Castilian and Aragonese Cortes paid homage to him as King of Aragon jointly with his mother.

Ferdinand's grandson and successor Charles, was to inherit not only the Spanish lands of his maternal grandparents, but the Austrian and Burgundian lands of his paternal family, which would make his heirs the most powerful rulers on the continent and, with the discoveries and conquests in the Americas and elsewhere, of the first truly global Empire.

Children

With his wife Isabella I the Catholic (whom he married 19 October 1469), King Ferdinand had seven children:

 Isabella (1470–1498), Princess of Asturias (1497–1498). She married first Afonso, Prince of Portugal, then after his death married his uncle Prince Manuel, the future King Emanuel I of Portugal. She died in childbirth delivering her son Miguel da Paz, Crown Prince of both Portugal and Spain who, in turn, died in infancy.
 A son miscarried on 31 May 1475 in Cebreros
 John (1478–1497), Prince of Asturias (1478–1497). He married Margaret of Habsburg (daughter of Emperor Maximilian I). He died of tuberculosis and his posthumous child with Margaret was stillborn.
 Joanna I (1479–1555), Princess of Asturias (1500–1504), Queen of Castile (1504–1555), Queen of Aragon (1516–1555). She married Philip I (Philip the handsome) (son of Emperor Maximilian I); and was the mother of King Charles I of Spain (also known as Charles V as Holy Roman Emperor). Ferdinand made her out to be mentally unstable and she was incarcerated by him, and then by her son, in Tordesillas for over 50 years. Her grandson, Philip II of Spain, was crowned in 1556.
 Maria (1482–1517). She married King Emanuel I of Portugal, the widower of her elder sister Isabella, and was the mother of King John III of Portugal and of the Cardinal-King, Henry I of Portugal.
 A stillborn daughter, twin of Maria. Born 1 July 1482 at dawn.
 Catalina (1485–1536), later known as Catherine of Aragon, queen of England. She married first Arthur, Prince of Wales, son of and heir to King Henry VII of England and, after Prince Arthur's death, she married his brother Henry, Duke of York, who also became Prince of Wales and then King Henry VIII. She thus became Queen of England and was the mother of Queen Mary I.

With his second wife, Germaine of Foix, niece of Louis XII of France 
(whom he married on 19 October 1505 in Blois, Kingdom of France), King Ferdinand had one son:
 John, Prince of Girona, who died hours after being born on 3 May 1509.

He also left several illegitimate children, two of them were born before his marriage to Isabella:

With Aldonza Ruiz de Iborre y Alemany, a Catalan noblewoman of Cervera, he had:
 Alonso de Aragón (1469–1520). Archbishop of Zaragoza and Viceroy of Aragon.

With Joana Nicolaua:
 Juana de Aragón (1469 – bef. 1522). She married Bernardino Fernández de Velasco, 1st Duke of Frías.

With Toda de Larrea:
 María Esperanza de Aragón (? – 1543). Abbess of Santa María la Real de Las Huelgas.

With Beatriz Pereira:
 (? – 1550). Nun at Madrigal de las Altas Torres.

Heraldry

Depiction in film and television

Films

TV series

See also
Catholic Monarchs
Spanish Empire

References

External links

 

|-

|-

|-

|-

|-

|-

|-

|-

|-

|-

 
1452 births
1516 deaths
15th-century Castilian monarchs
16th-century Castilian monarchs
15th-century Aragonese monarchs
16th-century Aragonese monarchs
15th-century Kings of Sicily
16th-century Kings of Sicily
16th-century monarchs of Naples
16th-century Navarrese monarchs
Aragonese infantes
Burials at the Royal Chapel of Granada
Counts of Barcelona
Dukes of Montblanc
Knights of the Garter
Grand Masters of the Order of Santiago
Galician monarchs
Ferdinand 2
House of Trastámara
Jure uxoris kings
Knights of Santiago
Knights of the Golden Fleece
Leonese monarchs
Monarchs of Majorca
People from Cinco Villas, Aragon
People of the Reconquista
Regents of Castile
Spanish Renaissance people
Valencian monarchs
Counts of Malta